Karayuki-san (唐行きさん) was the name given to Japanese girls and women in the late 19th and early 20th centuries who were trafficked from poverty-stricken agricultural prefectures in Japan to destinations in East Asia, Southeast Asia, Siberia (Russian Far East), Manchuria, British India, and Australia, to serve as sex workers.

History
 were Japanese women who travelled to, or were trafficked, to various parts of the Asia-Pacific region during the second half of the 19th, and the first half of the 20th centuries, to work as prostitutes, courtesans, and geisha. During this period, there was a network of Japanese prostitutes being trafficked across Asia, in what was then known as the ’Yellow Slave Traffic’.

Many of the women who went overseas to work as karayuki-san were the daughters of poor farming or fishing families, or were burakumin. The mediators, both male and female, who arranged for the women to go overseas would search for those of appropriate age in poor farming communities and pay their parents, telling them they were going overseas on public duty. The mediators would then make money by passing the girls on to people in the prostitution industry. With the money the mediators received, some would go on to set up their own overseas brothels.

The end of the Meiji period was the golden age for karayuki-san, and the girls that went on these overseas voyages were known fondly as joshigun (女子軍), or "female army." However the reality was that many courtesans led sad and lonely lives in exile and often died young from sexual diseases, neglect and despair. With the greater international influence of Japan as it became a Great Power, things began to change, and soon karayuki-san were considered shameful. During the 1910s and 1920s, Japanese officials overseas worked hard to eliminate Japanese brothels and maintain Japanese prestige, although not always with absolute success. Many karayuki-san returned to Japan, but some remained.

After the Pacific War, the topic of karayuki-san was a little known fact of Japan's pre-war underbelly. But in 1972 Tomoko Yamazaki published Sandakan Brothel No. 8 which raised awareness of karayuki-san and encouraged further research and reporting.

The main destinations of karayuki-san included China (particularly Shanghai), Korea, Hong Kong, the Philippines, Indonesia (especially Borneo and Sumatra), Thailand, and the western USA (in particular San Francisco). They were often sent to Western colonies in Asia where there was a strong demand from Western military personnel and Chinese men. There were cases of Japanese women being sent to places as far as Siberia, Manchuria, Hawaii, North America (California), and Africa (Zanzibar). In Karachi and Bombay there were Japanese prostitutes to be found.

The role of Japanese prostitutes in the expansion of Meiji Japan's imperialism has been examined in academic studies.

In the Russian Far East, east of Lake Baikal, Japanese prostitutes and merchants made up the majority of the Japanese community in the region after the 1860s. Japanese nationalist groups like the Black Ocean Society (Genyōsha) and Amur River Society-(Kokuryūkai), glorified and applauded the 'Amazon army' of Japanese prostitutes in the Russian Far East and Manchuria and enrolled them as members. Certain missions and intelligence gathering were performed around Vladivostok and Irkutsk by Japanese prostitutes.

The Sino-French War led to French soldiers creating a market for karayuki-san Japanese women prostitutes, eventually prostitutes made up the bulk of Indochina's Japanese population by 1908.

In the late 19th century Japanese girls and women were sold into prostitution and trafficked from Nagasaki and Kumamoto to cities like Hong Kong, Kuala Lumpur, and Singapore and then sent to other places in the Pacific, Southeast Asia and Western Australia, they were called Karayuki-san. In Western Australia these Japanese prostitutes plied their trade and also entered into other activities, a lot of them wed Chinese men and Japanese men as husbands and others some took Malay, Filipino and European partners.

Japanese girls were easily trafficked abroad since Korean and Chinese ports did not require Japanese citizens to use passports and the Japanese government realized that money earned by the karayuki-san helped the Japanese economy since it was being remitted, and the Chinese boycott of Japanese products in 1919 led to reliance on  revenue from the karayuki-san. Since the Japanese viewed non-westerners as inferior, the karayuki-san Japanese women felt humiliated since they mainly sexually served Chinese men, Korean men or native Southeast Asians. Borneo natives, Malaysians, Chinese, Korean, Japanese, French, American, British and men from every race utilized the Japanese prostitutes of Sandakan. A Japanese woman named Osaki said that the men, Japanese, Chinese, Korean, whites, and natives, were dealt with alike by the prostitutes regardless of race, and that a Japanese prostitute's "most disgusting customers" were Japanese men, while they used "kind enough" to describe Chinese and Korean men, and the English and Americans were the second best clients, while the native men were the best and fastest to have sex with. The nine Japanese managed brothels of Sandakan made up the bulk of brothels in Sandakan. Two Japanese brothels were located in Kuudatsu while no Chinese brothels were to be found there. There was hearsay that a Chinese man married the older sister of Yamashita Tatsuno.

During the American period, Japanese economic ties to the Philippines expanded tremendously and by 1929 Japan was the largest trading partner to the Philippines after the United States. Economic investment was accompanied by large-scale immigration of Japanese to the Philippines, mainly merchants, gardeners and prostitutes ('karayuki san'). Davao in Mindanao had at that time over 20,000 ethnic Japanese residents.

Between ca. 1872 and 1940 large numbers of Japanese prostitutes (karayuki-san) worked in brothels of the Dutch East Indies archipelago.

In Australia and Singapore 
The immigrants coming to northern Australia were Melanesian, South-East Asian, and Chinese who were almost all men, along with the Japanese, who were the only anomaly in that they included women. Racist Australians who subscribed to white supremacy were grateful for and condoned the immigration of Japanese prostitutes since these non-white labourers satisfied their sexual needs with Japanese women instead of white women since they didn't want white women having sex with the non-white males. In Australia the definition of white was even narrowed down to people of Anglo-Saxon British origin. Italian and French women were also considered "foreign" prostitutes alongside Japanese women and were supported by the police and governments in Western Australia to ply their trade since these women would service "coloured" men and act as a safeguard for British white Anglo-Saxon women. The Honourable R.H. Underwood, a politician in western Australia, celebrated the fact that there were many Italian, Japanese, and French prostitutes in western Australia in an address to the Legislative Assembly in 1915.

In Western and Eastern Australia, gold mining Chinese men were serviced by Japanese Karayuki-san prostitutes. In Northern Australia in the sugarcane, pearling and mining industries, the Japanese prostitutes serviced Kanakas, Malays, and Chinese. These women arrived in Australia or America via Kuala Lumpur and Singapore where they were instructed in prostitution. They originated from Japan's poor farming areas and the Australian colonial officials approved of allowing in Japanese prostitutes in order to sexually service "coloured' men, since they thought that white women would be raped if the Japanese prostitutes weren't available.

Port towns experienced benefits to their economies from the presence of Japanese brothels.

In eastern Australia Chinese men married European women. Japanese prostitutes were embraced by the officials in Queensland since they were assumed to help stop white women having sex with nonwhite men. Italian, French, and Japanese prostitutes plied their trade in Western Australia.

On the goldfields Japanese prostitutes were attacked by anti-Asian white Australians who wanted them to leave, with Raymond Radclyffe in 1896 and Rae Frances reporting on men who demanded that the Japanese prostitutes be expelled from gold fields.

Japanese women prostitutes in Australia were the 3rd most widespread profession. The Queensland Police Comiissionee said that they were "a service essential to the economic growth of the north", "made life more palatable for European and Asian men who worked in pearling, mining and pastoral industries" and it was written that "the supply of Japanese women for the Kanaka demand is less revolting and degrading than would be the case were it met by white women".

Between 1890 and 1894 Singapore received 3,222 Japanese women who were trafficked from Japan by the Japanese man Muraoka Iheiji, before being trafficked to Singapore or further destinations. For a few months, the Japanese women would be held in Hong Kong. Even though the Japanese government tried banning Japanese prostitutes from leaving Japan in 1896 the measure failed to stop the trafficking of Japanese women and a ban in Singapore against importing the women failed too. In the 1890s Australia began receiving immigration in the form of Japanese women working as prostitutes. In 1896, there were 200 Japanese prostitutes in Australia. In Darwin, 19 Japanese women were found by the Japanese official H. Sato in 1889. The Japanese man Takada Tokujiro had trafficked 5 of the women via Hong Kong from Nagasaki. He "had sold one to a Malay barber for £50, two to a Chinese at £40 each, one he had kept as his concubine; the fifth he was working as a prostitute". Sato said that the women were living "a shameful life to the disgrace of their countrymen'.

Around areas like ports, mines, and the pastoral industry, numerous European and Chinese men patronized Japanese prostitutes such as Matsuwe Otana.

During the late 1880s to the 20th century Australian brothels were filled with hundreds of Japanese women. Those Japanese overseas women and girl prostitutes were called karayuki-san, which meant 'gone to China'.

Japanese prostitutes initially showed up in 1887 in Australia and were a major component of the prostitution industry on the colonial frontiers in Australia such as parts of Queensland, northern and western Australia. The British Empire and Japanese Empire's growth were tied in with the karayuki-san. In the late 19th century, Japan's impoverished farming islands provided the girls who became karayuki-san and were shipped to the Pacific and South-East Asia. The volcanic and mountainous terrain of Kyushu was bad for agriculture so parents sold their daughters, some of them as young as seven years old to "flesh traders" (zegen) in the prefectures of Nagasaki and Kumamoto. Four-fifths of the girls were involuntarily trafficked while only one-fifth left of their own will.

The voyages the traffickers transported these women on had terrible conditions with some girls suffocating as they were hidden on parts of the ship or almost starved to death. The girls who lived were then taught how to perform as prostitutes in Hong Kong, Kuala Lumpur, or Singapore where they then were sent off to other places including Australia.

A Queensland Legislative Assembly member in 1907 reported that Japanese prostitutes in the small town of Charters Towers lived in bad conditions while in 1896 in the larger town of Marble Bar in Western Australia, Albert Calvert reported that the conditions in Japanese brothels were good and comfortable.

After the First Sino-Japanese War a celebration was held at an open-air concert by Japanese prostitutes who performed a dance in Broome in 1895.

The development of the Japanese enclave in Singapore at Middle Road, Singapore was connected to the establishment of brothels east of the Singapore River, namely along Hylam, Malabar, Malay and Bugis Streets during the late 1890s. The Japanese prostitutes or Karayuki-san dubbed Malay Street as Suteretsu, a transliteration of the English word "street". A Japanese reporter in 1910 described the scene for the people of Kyūshū in a local newspaper, the Fukuoka Nichinichi:

During the Meiji era, many Japanese girls from poor households were taken to East Asia and Southeast Asia in the second half of the 19th century to work as prostitutes. Many of these women are said to have originated from the Amakusa Islands of Kumamoto Prefecture, which had a large and long-stigmatised Japanese Christian community. Referred to as Karayuki-san (Hiragana: からゆきさん, Kanji: 唐行きさん literally "Ms. Gone-overseas"), they were found at the Japanese enclave along Hylam, Malabar, Malay and Bugis Streets until World War II.

The vast majority of Japanese emigrants to Southeast Asia in the early Meiji period were prostitutes (Karayuki-san), who worked in brothels in Malaya, Singapore, Philippines, Dutch East Indies and French Indochina.

Most early Japanese residents of Singapore consisted largely of prostitutes, who would later become known by the collective name of "karayuki-san". The earliest Japanese prostitutes are believed to have arrived 1870 or 1871; by 1889, there were 134 of them. From 1895 to 1918, Japanese authorities turned a blind eye to the emigration of Japanese women to work in brothels in Southeast Asia. According to the Japanese consul in Singapore, almost all of the 450 to 600 Japanese residents of Singapore in 1895 were prostitutes and their pimps, or concubines; fewer than 20 were engaged in "respectable trades". In 1895, there were no Japanese schools or public organisations, and the Japanese consulate maintained only minimal influence over their nationals; brothel owners were the dominating force in the community. Along with victory in the Sino-Japanese War, the Japanese state's increasing assertiveness brought changes to the official status of Japanese nationals overseas; they attained formal legal equality with Europeans. That year, the Japanese community was also given official permission by the government to create their own cemetery, on twelve acres of land in Serangoon outside of the urbanised area; in reality, the site had already been used as a burial ground for Japanese as early as 1888.

However, even with these changes in their official status, the community itself remained prostitution-based. Prostitutes were the vanguard of what one pair of scholars describes as the "karayuki-led economic advance into Southeast Asia". It was specifically seen by the authorities as a way to develop a Japanese economic base in the region; profits extracted from the prostitution trade were used to accumulate capital and diversify Japanese economic interests. The prostitutes served as both creditors and customers to other Japanese: they loaned out their earnings to other Japanese residents trying to start businesses, and patronised Japanese tailors, doctors, and grocery stores. By the time of the Russo-Japanese War, the number of Japanese prostitutes in Singapore may have been as large as 700. They were concentrated around Malay Street (now Middle Road). However, with Southeast Asia cut off from European imports due to World War I, Japanese products began making inroads as replacements, triggering the shift towards retailing and trade as the economic basis of the Japanese community.

In film and literature 
The Japanese film studios shot a number of films in Shonan (what the Japanese renamed Singapore during the occupation in World War II) depicting the area as a sort of Japanese frontier. Films such as Southern Winds II (続・南の風, 1942, Shochiku Studios), Tiger of Malay (マライの虎, 1942, Daiei Studios) or Singapore All-Out Attack (シンガポール総攻撃, 1943, Daiei Studios) presented the area as a land rich in resources, occupied by simple but honest people, and highly exotic.  Japanese colonial films also associated the region with sex as many "Karayuki-san", or prostitutes had been either sold to brothels or chosen to go to Southeast Asia to earn money around the turn of the century. Karayuki-san (からゆきさん, 1937, Toho Studios), Kinoshita Keisuke's Flowering Port (花咲く港, 1943, Shochiku Studios), and Shohei Imamura's Whoremonger (女衒, 1987, Toei Studios), which were all or at least partly shot on location, are examples of the extent to which this subgenre dominates the representations of Malaysia in Japanese cinema.

The 1975 film Karayuki-san, the Making of a Prostitute directed by Shohei Imamura, the 1974 film Sandakan No. 8 directed by Kei Kumai, and the Shimabara Lullaby by Kohei Miyazaki were about the karayuki-san.

The memoir of Keiko Karayuki-san in Siam was written about Karayuki-san in Thailand. Ah Ku and Karayuki-san: Prostitution in Singapore, 1870–1940 was written about karayuki-san in Singapore.

Postcards were made in French colonial Indo-China of Japanese prostitutes, and in British ruled Singapore.

Harry La Tourette Foster wrote that 'in years past, old-timers say, the entire Orient was filled with Japanese prostitutes, until the Japanese had much the same reputation as the French have in foreign cities elsewhere'.

The experience of Japanese prostitutes in China was written about in a book by a Japanese woman, Tomoko Yamazaki.

During her years as a prostitute, Yamada Waka serviced both Chinese men and Japanese men.

See also
 Slavery in Japan

References

Bibliography
 
 
 
 
 
 
 
 
 
 
 
 
 
 
 
 
 

Women in Japan
Euphemisms
Forced prostitution
Human trafficking in Japan
Qing dynasty
Japanese slaves
History of the Philippines (1898–1946)
Prostitution in Japan